John Chandler is an American politician and soldier from Maine.

John Chandler may also refer to:

 John Chandler (bishop) (died 1426), medieval Bishop of Salisbury
 John Beals Chandler (1887–1962), Lord Mayor of Brisbane (1940–1952) and member of Queensland parliament
 John Chandler (athlete) (1907–1969), South African athlete
 John Davis Chandler (1935–2010), American film character actor
 John Chandler (educator) (1923–2022), 12th president of Williams College
 John Chandler (sport shooter) (1924–2016), British Olympic shooter
 John Chandler (sheriff) (1693–1762), judge of probate and sheriff of Worcester County, Massachusetts
 John Westbrooke Chandler (1764–1804/5), British painter
 John H. Chandler (1909–1987), English botanist
 John E. Chandler (1915–1982), Kansas state senator

See also
John Chandler Gurney (1896–1985), U.S. senator known as Chan Gurney